This is a list of lists of hills

By form
 List of artificial hills
 List of breast-shaped hills

Germany
 List of hills of Berlin
 List of hills of Brandenburg
 List of hills of Hamburg
 List of hills of Mecklenburg-Vorpommern
 List of hills of the Schönbuch
 List of hills of Schleswig-Holstein
 List of hills in the Teutoburg Forest

United Kingdom
 List of Birketts
 List of hills of Cornwall
 List of Dartmoor tors and hills
 List of hills of Devon
 List of hills of Dorset
 List of hills of East Sussex
 List of hills of Gloucestershire
 List of hills of Hampshire
 List of hills of the Isle of Wight
 List of hills of Kent
 List of fells in the Lake District
 List of hills in the Lake District
 List of hills in the North Pennines
 List of hills in the Peak District
 List of hills of Somerset
 List of Wainwrights
 List of hills of West Sussex
 List of hills of Wiltshire
 List of peaks in the Yorkshire Dales

United States
 List of hills in San Francisco

See also

 List of cities claimed to be built on seven hills
 Lists of highest points
 Lists of mountains

References 

Hills